Côte-des-Neiges–Notre-Dame-de-Grâce is a borough (arrondissement) of Montreal, Quebec, Canada. The borough was created following the 2002 municipal reorganization of Montreal. It comprises two main neighbourhoods, Côte-des-Neiges and Notre-Dame-de-Grâce, both former towns that were annexed by the city of Montreal in 1910.

Côte-des-Neiges–Notre-Dame-de-Grâce is the most populous borough of Montreal, with a population of 166,520  according to the 2016 Census. It is an ethnically diverse borough, and there is also a large student population due to the presence of two universities, Université de Montréal and the Loyola campus of Concordia University.

History

The colonization of the territory of the borough of Côte-des-Neiges–Notre-Dame-de-Grâce, located on the western and northern flanks of Mount Royal, began in the era of New France. In the beginning, Côte-des-Neiges was frequented by vacationing members of the Montreal bourgeoisie. The first inhabitants of the area worked in the tanning industry in the eighteenth and nineteenth centuries. The area urbanized following the arrival of its first public and religious institutions in the late nineteenth century. The establishment of Université de Montréal in Côte-des-Neiges in the 1930s accelerated its growth.

Notre-Dame-de-Grâce was agricultural land prior to the arrival of streetcars in 1908. The inhabitants of the area were predominantly anglophone. The urbanization of this area occurred between the 1910s and the 1930s. The establishment of Loyola College (today Concordia University) contributed to the growth of the area.

Saint Joseph's Oratory opened on Queen Mary Road in Côte-des-Neiges in 1955. It is the most important pilgrimage site dedicated to St. Joseph in the world. The Décarie Expressway opened to motorists in 1966, in time for Expo 67. The construction of the expressway, which cuts through both Côte-des-Neiges and Notre-Dame-de-Grâce, resulted in the displacement of 285 families from their homes.

Geography
Located to the north and west of Mount Royal, it was part of the City of Montreal prior to the 2002 municipal mergers. It is composed of the districts of Notre-Dame-de-Grâce and Côte-des-Neiges, and also includes the redeveloped neighbourhood Le Triangle.

The irregularly shaped borough is bounded on the north by the town of Mount Royal, on the east by Outremont, on the southeast by Ville-Marie and Westmount, on the south by Le Sud-Ouest, and on the west by Côte Saint-Luc, Hampstead, and Montreal West. The Notre Dame des Neiges Cemetery is in the south east corner of the borough.

It has an area of 21,4 km² (8¼ sq. mi.) and a population of 166,520 making it the most populous of Montreal's boroughs.

Government

Municipal

Following the 7 November 2021 Montreal municipal election, the current borough council consists of the following councillors:

Federal and provincial
The borough is divided among the following federal ridings:
Mount Royal
Outremont
Notre-Dame-de-Grâce—Westmount

It is divided among the following provincial electoral districts:
D'Arcy-McGee
Notre-Dame-de-Grâce
Outremont
Mont-Royal

Transport

Côte-des-Neiges–Notre-Dame-de-Grâce is served by two lines and ten stations of the Montreal Metro. There are seven stations in the borough on the Orange line: the Vendôme and Villa-Maria stations in Notre-Dame-de-Grâce, and the Snowdon, Côte-Sainte-Catherine, Plamondon, Namur and De La Savane stations in Côte-des-Neiges. The borough is served by four stations on the Blue line, all of which are in Côte-des-Neiges: Snowdon, Côte-des-Neiges, Université-de-Montréal and Édouard-Montpetit.

The borough is currently served by two stations on four lines on the Réseau de transport métropolitain's commuter rail network. The Vendôme station, in Notre-Dame-de-Grâce, is served by three lines, the Vaudreuil-Hudson line, the Saint-Jérôme line and the Candiac line. The Canora station in Côte-des-Neiges is served by the Deux-Montagnes and Mascouche line lines.

The borough is traversed by the Décarie Expressway.

Education

Colleges and universities

Two universities are located in the borough. Université de Montréal and École Polytechnique de Montréal are located on Édouard Montpetit Boulevard in Côte-des-Neiges. HEC Montréal, the independent affiliated business school of Université de Montréal, is located nearby on Côte-Sainte-Catherine Road.

Concordia University's Loyola campus, is located on Sherbrooke Street West in Notre-Dame-de-Grâce, near Montreal West.

Primary and secondary schools
The Commission scolaire de Montréal operates Francophone public schools.

The English Montreal School Board (EMSB) operates Anglophone public schools.

Several private high schools are located in the borough. These include the francophone Collège Jean-de-Brébeuf, Collège Notre-Dame and Collège International Marie de France, the bilingual Villa Maria High School and the anglophone Lower Canada College, Loyola High School and College Prep International.

Public libraries
The borough has four libraries of the Montreal Public Libraries Network: Benny, Bibliothèque interculturelle, Côte-des-Neiges, and Notre-Dame-de-Grâce.

Attractions
Attractions in the borough include the Segal Centre for Performing Arts, Snowdon Theatre, the Empress Theatre, Saint Joseph's Oratory and the Gibeau Orange Julep fast-food restaurant. Other attractions also include the Montreal Holocaust Memorial Center and the Spanish and Portuguese Synagogue of Montreal. The Notre-Dame-des-Neiges Cemetery is also located in the borough.

Demographics

Source:

See also
 Boroughs of Montreal
 Districts of Montreal
 Municipal reorganization in Quebec

References

External links
Borough website
All Building of Côte-des-Neiges–Notre-Dame-de-Grâce on Image Montreal

 
Boroughs of Montreal
Academic enclaves